Alejandro Javier Acosta Torres (born July 3, 1980) is a former Uruguayan football player, who last played as a defender for Venados in the Mexican Ascenso MX.

Career
Acosta Started his football career in Chilean side Cobresal in 2005. Later on he was transferred to Chilean club O'Higgins in 2006 where he played 18 games before been transferred to club Unión Española in 2007. He played 17 games before been transferred to Uruguayan club Defensor in 2008 where he scored his first professional goal. That same year he was transferred to Mexican club Puebla FC where he has established himself as an important player in the club, scoring 2 goals in the 2009 playoffs, getting the club in to the semifinals before being knocked out by Pumas.

He joined Veracruz during the 2011 Liga de Ascenso draft that took place on June 9, 2011, in Playa del Carmen.

In August 2012 Acosta signed a new deal with Cerro Largo FC of the Uruguayan Primera División.

References

External links
 Profile at Soccerway
 Alejandro Acosta's statistics
 Profile at BDFA

1980 births
Living people
Uruguayan footballers
Uruguayan expatriate footballers
Association football defenders
Defensor Sporting players
C.A. Progreso players
Club Puebla players
Cobresal footballers
Unión Española footballers
O'Higgins F.C. footballers
C.D. Veracruz footballers
Dorados de Sinaloa footballers
Cerro Largo F.C. players
Miramar Misiones players
Boston River players
Expatriate footballers in Chile
Expatriate footballers in Mexico
Expatriate footballers in Guatemala
Uruguayan expatriate sportspeople in Chile
Uruguayan expatriate sportspeople in Mexico
Uruguayan expatriate sportspeople in Guatemala
Liga MX players
Deportivo Petapa players